Explosion is a 1923 German silent film directed by Karl Grune and starring Liane Haid and Carl de Vogt. It was shot at the Marienfelde Studios in Berlin.

Cast

References

Bibliography

External links

1923 films
Films of the Weimar Republic
Films directed by Karl Grune
German silent feature films
UFA GmbH films
Films about mining
German black-and-white films
Films shot at Terra Studios
1920s German films